Aquaviva or Aqua Viva was an ancient Roman settlement in Pannonia, the crossroads that had connected Poetovio (today's Ptuj) in the west with Mursa (Osijek) to the east and Siscia (Sisak) to the south. Its precise location is unknown; it is speculated that it's located in Petrijanec near Varaždin. Earlier sources placed it somewhere between Maruševec and Sveti Juraj.

References

Sources
 

Populated places in Pannonia
Roman sites in Croatia